Daramalan College is a Roman Catholic high school in Canberra, Australia, located in the suburb of Dickson. It encompasses Year 7 to Year 12, in a co-educational environment. Run by the Missionaries of the Sacred Heart, it has an emblem of a red eagle on a black shield. Its theme colours are red and black.

History
Daramalan College was founded in 1962 as an all-boys school, with girls enrolling in Years 11 and 12 from 1977, and in Year 7 onwards in 1996. The school's motto is "Fortes in Fide," which translates from Latin to "Strong in Faith." In 2017 Daramalan renovated the Dempsey Wing, designed to allow improved education in Science and English. It features new Science Labs and three English classrooms. This building started constructions in 2016 and ended in 2017. Also included in the building is a new Uniform Shop.  The Dempsey Wing is named after a former member of staff. Daramalan College celebrated its 50th anniversary in 2012.

Notable alumni

 Peter Bowler – cricketer, (Leicestershire, Tasmania, Derbyshire)
 Joanne Brown (née Alchin Class of 1989) – 1996 and 2000 Australian Softball Olympian bronze medallist
 Stephen Conroy – Federal politician, former Minister for Broadband, Communications and the Digital Economy (2007–2013)
 Lara Cox – actor
 Matt Frawley – rugby league player 
 Philip Gerrans – philosopher and cricketer
 Mack Hansen – rugby union player 
 Marc Herbert – rugby league player
 Nathan Buckley – Australian rules footballer and coach
 Adam Hyde – half of music duo Peking Duk
 Professor Kiaran Kirk – Dean, ANU College of Science
 Justice Dr Jeremy Kirk – Rhodes Scholar, Vinerian Scholar and Judge of the Supreme Court of New South Wales and a Judge of Appeal
 Tim Kirk – Clonakilla chief winemaker
 Nick Kouparitsas – rugby league player
 Nick Kyrgios – tennis player
 Robbie Perkins – professional baseball player 
 Tom Rogers – Australian cricketer for Tasmania
 Marty Sheargold – stand-up comedian and radio broadcaster
 Ivan Soldo – Australian rules footballer
 Lauren Wells – Australian athlete at 2012 Olympic Games

See also
 Associated Southern Colleges

References

External links 
 Daramalan College

High schools in the Australian Capital Territory
Rock Eisteddfod Challenge participants
Educational institutions established in 1962
Missionaries of the Sacred Heart
Association of Marist Schools of Australia
1962 establishments in Australia